The Greenbrier Companies is an American publicly traded transportation manufacturing corporation based in Lake Oswego, Oregon, United States. Greenbrier specializes in transportation services, notably marine barge and freight railcar manufacturing, railcar refurbishment and railcar leasing/management services. The company is one of the leading designers, manufacturers and marketers of rail freight equipment in North America and Europe. It also has operations in South America and Turkey. Greenbrier is a leading provider of wheelsets, parts, management, leasing and other services to the railroad and related transportation industries in North America. As of August 31, 2021, Greenbrier employs 12,155 people across its global operations. Formed in 1981 and publicly traded since 1994, the company generates revenues of US$2.8 billion.

The company has manufacturing facilities in Portland, Oregon; Paragould and Marmaduke, Arkansas; Świdnica, Poland; Hortolândia, Brazil; and Adana, Turkey, as well as three railcar manufacturing facilities in Mexico (Monclova, Ciudad Sahagún, and Tlaxcala) and three in Romania (Arad, Caracal, and Drobeta-Turnu Severin).

History

Gunderson Inc.
In 1919, Chester Ellsworth Gunderson, the son of a Swedish immigrant, founded the Wire Wheel Sales & Service Company, acting as a distribution partner for the Houk Company, a Pennsylvania-based wire wheels manufacturer. His brother, Alvin Gunderson, joined the company in 1923. In 1925, the company became the Wheel & Rim Service Inc.

By the 1930s, the company had expanded into other automobile parts servicing. After an unsuccessful foray into the fertilizer distribution business, the company began to manufacture trailers, which required an investment of over $12,000. In 1937, the company began manufacturing dual-axle trailers suitable for on- and off-road use. The new trailer design was a commercial success and, in 1938, the incorporated company Gunderson Bros. was formed with its factory in Linnton, Portland, Oregon. In 1941, the company began building barges. The company distributed, installed and pioneered the use of General Motors diesel engines.

In 1938, the company was near bankruptcy, in part due to the effects of the Great Depression and in part due to the Gundersons' own financial mismanagement. The company's main creditor took control of their accounts and began to pay their suppliers. Yet the company's financial position remained tenuous.

At the beginning of the Second World War, the company handled assembly work for the United States Navy; in 1941, a loan from the Navy enabled Gunderson Bros. to build a shipyard. During the same period, the company's continued debts caused the Federal Government to take the original factory as security. The company also constructed lifeboats, landing crafts and other vessels, as well as trailers for the United States Army. A shortage of manpower also led to the first women working in the construction sheds.

In 1942, the company became Gunderson Bros. Engineering Corporation. After World War II, the Linnton facility was closed and the company owned comprehensive facilities for large-scale metal engineering as well as a slipway for launching ships at the Front Avenue manufacturing facility. Construction of marine vessels such as tugs, peacetime barges, trawlers and more specialized craft continued in the 1950s and 1960s. Other postwar business lines included metal water towers, large-scale metal storage tanks, bridges and structural steel for buildings, as well as specialized equipment such as metal slipways for the McNary Dam (1950s), a dry dock for the Port of Portland (1963) and the vessel RP FLIP (1962).

In 1958, the company entered the freight railcar business with a successful bid to construct 200 boxcar underframes for the Southern Pacific Railroad. The business was successful and profitable, and the order expanded, with Gunderson eventually building more than 2,000 frames in the first contract.

In 1965, the Gundersons sold their company to the FMC Corporation and, in 1973, it became the Marine and Rail Equipment Division of FMC (MRED). In 1979, it produced more than 6,000 railcars. The following year, however, the early 1980s recession began. Many orders were cancelled and new orders plummeted; in 1982, only 25 railcars were built. Simultaneously, new developments in rail freight transport led to new products, such as multi-platform articulated spine car sets (used for TOFC transportation of highway semi-trailers) built for the Itel Corporation. Also in the 1980s, the company developed "Twin-Stack" wells for double-stack rail transport of intermodal containers in a joint venture with Greenbrier. The Twin-Stack became an important product, with approximately 3,000 being produced in 1990. By 2018, Greenbrier produced over 100,000 intermodal wells.

In 1985, MRED was acquired by The Greenbrier Companies. The Gunderson plant remains a successful facility and continues to produce oceangoing barges.

The Greenbrier Companies

In 1970, the Commercial Metals Company and M.D. Friedman companies jointly formed a flatcar leasing company called Greenbrier Leasing Corporation. In 1981, Commercial Metals sold the company to Alan James and William A. Furman,  the owners of James-Furman & Company and founders of The Greenbrier Companies. In 1985, Greenbrier entered the Oregon manufacturing market through the acquisition of MRED and renamed it Gunderson, Inc.

By the early 1990s, the company's sales and profits increased dramatically due to an increase in North American rail freight development and transportation needs. The company went public in 1994 and, in 1995, acquired TrentonWorks, another rail freight rolling stock manufacturing facility in Nova Scotia, Canada. The TrentonWorks facility closed in 2007 as a result of unfavorable exchange rates and lower operating costs in Mexico.

In 1991, Greenbrier established its rail services division, adding to its maintenance and refurbishment capabilities.

In 1998, the company acquired Polish railcar manufacturer Wagony Świdnica. The same year, Greenbrier formed a joint venture with Bombardier Inc. in a former Concarril facility located in Sahagún, Mexico. In 2004, Bombardier's stake in the venture was acquired; the operation now goes by Greenbrier Sahagún.

Between 2006 and 2008, the company bought several rolling stock equipment companies, including the addition of Greenbrier GIMSA. The joint venture was formed in Mexico in 2006 with Grupo Industrial Monclova.

In December 2012, Carl Icahn made an offer to purchase Greenbrier for $20 a share, which represented a 5.4% premium to Greenbrier's stock price at that time. His offer was rejected.

In response to growing safety concerns surrounding increasing levels of hazardous tank car shipments, in 2014 Greenbrier introduced the “Tank Car of the Future,” a new generation of tank cars featuring safety enhancements that were adopted by PHMSA as part of a new industry standard, the DOT-117 tank car. The company led the award-winning Safer Tank Cars Now campaign, which is still archived in the Library of Congress.

In 2014, Greenbrier announced a railcar maintenance joint venture company with Watco called GBW Railcar Services. In, 2018, Greenbrier and Watco announced the discontinuation of the joint venture to allow both companies to better capitalize on railcar maintenance  demands in the North American market. Under the agreement, the railcar maintenance shops and employees at each location were returned to management by their previous operators.

In 2015, Greenbrier opened Greenbrier Tlaxcala, a wholly owned railcar manufacturing facility in Tlaxcala, Mexico. The company also acquired a 19.5% stake in Amsted-Maxion Hortolândia, a Brazilian railcar manufacturer, for US$15 million; Greenbrier took a majority interest of Greenbrier Maxion in 2017. Additionally in 2015, the Saudi Railway Company (SAR) awarded Greenbrier a contract with the Public Investment Fund (PIF) to manufacture nearly 1,200 tank wagons.

In 2016, The Greenbrier Companies and AstraRail Management (AstraRail Industries, Romania) announced the merging of their European activities into a joint venture, Greenbrier AstraRail. As part of the agreement, Greenbrier agreed to pay AstraRail $60 million. The joint venture eventually became 75% owned by Greenbrier.

In 2018, Greenbrier completed an agreement between Turkish railcar manufacturer and maintenance and parts services provider Rayvag Vagon Sanayi ve Ticaret A.S and Greenbrier's European subsidiary, Greenbrier AstraRail, to take a 68% ownership stake in Rayvag.

In 2019, Greenbrier launched its first environmental, social and governance (ESG) report. Since then, it has adopted the Sustainability Accounting Standards Board (SASB) reporting framework. 

Also in 2019, Greenbrier acquired American Railcar Industries (ARI), a transaction valued at $400 million. The acquisition added two railcar manufacturing and two railcar component and part producers to Greenbrier's operations, increasing the company's U.S.-based workforce and insulating it from uncertainties related to North American free trade.

In 2021, Greenbrier formed GBX Leasing, a joint venture with The Longwood Group, a Chicago-based transportation equipment advisory and asset management firm, to develop an owned portfolio of leased railcars to be built primarily by Greenbrier.

That same year, Greenbrier was recognized as an "Oregon History Maker" by the Oregon Historical Society.

Products and services

Marine
Located on a deep-water site in Portland, Oregon, Greenbrier Gunderson manufactures Jones Act-compliant oceangoing conventional deck barges, heavy-lift deck barges, double-hull tank barges, articulated barges (ATBs), barges for aggregates, railcar/deck barges, split-hull dump barges and hopper barges for heavy industrial products. Since 1919, the facility has constructed more than 2,000 marine vessels. This is the only Greenbrier operation to produce marine equipment.

Rail vehicles

North America
Greenbrier operates six new railcar manufacturing facilities in North America: Greenbrier Gunderson (Portland, Oregon), Greenbrier Paragould (Paragould, Arkansas), Greenbrier Marmaduke (Marmaduke, Arkansas), Greenbrier Sahagún (Sahagún, Mexico), Greenbrier Tlaxcala (Tlaxcala, Mexico) and Greenbrier GIMSA (Monclova, Mexico). Equipment manufactured includes intermodal and conventional railcars, including boxcars, center partitions, covered hoppers, double stacks, flatcars, gondolas, tank cars, auto racks, and two proprietary automobile carriers: the AutoMax and Multi-Max.

Eastern Europe
Greenbrier Europe produces conventional freight railcars at Greenbrier Wagony Świdnica (Świdnica, Poland) and Greenbrier AstraRail (Arad, Drobeta-Turnu Severin and Caracal, Romania).

Turkey 
Greenbrier operates Rayvag, a railcar manufacturing company in Adana, Turkey. Rayvag also provides maintenance services and manufactures bogies and spare parts for railcars in the region.

Greenbrier Rail Services
Greenbrier Rail Services (GRS) sells reconditioned wheelsets and provides wheel services throughout the United States. GRS also reconditions, manufactures and sells railcar parts and operates an independent railcar maintenance and repair shop network across the U.S.

Leasing and management
Together, Greenbrier Leasing Company LLC (GLC) and GBX Leasing (GBXL) own railcar lease fleets in North America. Greenbrier also runs a railcar syndications platform as a function of its leasing business. Greenbrier Management Services (GMS) supports approximately 445,000 railcars, facilitating operations on almost every Class I railroad. GMS offers services such as railcar maintenance management, car hire processing, regulatory compliance and railcar re-marketing.

See also
 List of companies based in Oregon

References

Sources
  (online chapter via www.fundinguniverse.com)

External links
The Greenbrier Companies 2020 Annual Report
Greenbrier Facebook page (@grbxcompanies)
Greenbrier LinkedIn page

Companies listed on the New York Stock Exchange
Companies based in Lake Oswego, Oregon
Vehicle manufacturing companies established in 1981
Manufacturing companies based in Oregon
Rolling stock leasing companies
Rolling stock manufacturers of the United States
1981 establishments in Oregon
1994 initial public offerings